AM is a New Zealand morning news and talk show that airs on Three and was simulcasted on Magic Talk. It was presented by Ryan Bridge, with news anchor Amanda  Gillies, sports presenter Mark Richardson, and social media presenter Aziz Al-Sa'afin. Amanda Gillies was made redundant at the end of 2021. She fills in when needed if no one else is available.  It was presented by Duncan Garner until his resignation in August 2021.

The show replaced Paul Henry after it was announced the frontman of the show, Paul Henry, was resigning and therefore the show was going to be replaced. The announcement was made by MediaWorks in November 2016, and Paul Henry last aired on 16 December 2016. The show's reporters are Sinelle Fernandez in Auckland, and Ashleigh McCaull in Wellington.

It premiered on 13 February 2017.

Rebranding to AM 
A new breakfast television show began on Tuesday 8 February 2022, with the name changing to AM. The newly reformatted AM show is currently presented by Ryan Bridge, Melissa Chan-Green, Bernadine Oliver-Kerby and William Wairua. It no longer airs on radio. AM now is On-Air from 5:30am-9am with Bernadine Oliver-Kerby Hosting AM Early from 5:30am-6am

AM Early is a 30 Minute Bulletin from 5:30am-6am where Bernadine Oliver-Kerby updates New Zealanders on any breaking news overnight + Business.
at 6am Ryan Bridge, Melissa Chan-Green Join the show for AM which goes until 9am

Presenters

Anchors 

|-
| 8 February 2022
|Bernadine Oliver Kerby

Presenter

News & Sport Presnter

Social media presenter

Backup presenters

References

External links 
 Website

2010s New Zealand television series
2020s New Zealand television series
2017 New Zealand television series debuts
Breakfast television in New Zealand
New Zealand television news shows
New Zealand television talk shows
Three (TV channel) original programming